Artem Muladjanov, born 4 February 1988, is a retired Kyrgyzstani footballer who is a midfielder, last played for Alga Bishkek. His brother Artur, also played for the same club.

International career
He was a member of the Kyrgyzstan national football team.

References

 rsssf.com

External links
 Profile Goal.com
 

1988 births
Living people
Kyrgyzstan international footballers
Kyrgyzstani footballers
Footballers at the 2006 Asian Games
Footballers at the 2010 Asian Games
Association football midfielders
Asian Games competitors for Kyrgyzstan